A spirit tablet, memorial tablet, or ancestral tablet, is a placard used to designate the seat of a deity or past ancestor as well as to enclose it. The name of the deity or past ancestor is usually inscribed onto the tablet. With origins in traditional Chinese culture, the spirit tablet is a common sight in many Sinosphere countries where any form of ancestor veneration is practiced. Spirit tablets are traditional ritual objects commonly seen in temples, shrines, and household altars throughout Mainland China and Taiwan.

General usage
A spirit tablet is often used for deities or ancestors (either generally or specifically: e.g. for a specific relative or for one's entire family tree). Shrines are generally found in and around households (for household gods and ancestors), in temples for specific deities, or in ancestral shrines for the clan's founders and specific ancestors. In each place, there are specific locations for individual spirit tablets for ancestors or one or another particular deity. A spirit tablet acts as an effigy of a specific deity or ancestor. When used, incense sticks or joss sticks are usually burned before the tablet in some kind of brazier or incense holder. Sometimes fruit, tea, pastries, or other offertory items are placed near the tablet to offer food to that particular spirit or divinity. 

In Chinese folk religion a household will have one or more tablets for specific deities and family ancestors:
 One near the front door, and at or around eye level, dedicated to the Jade Emperor. Generally, but not always, this tablet will be above the tablet dedicated to Tudigong. This tablet reads .
 Some houses will have a tablet at or near the gate which reads  "this tablet is dedicated to the Door Gods".
 One outside the house at the front door on the ground, dedicated to Tudigong, an Earth Deity. This tablet usually reads  (less commonly ).  
 One in the kitchen, dedicated to Zao Jun, the kitchen god, which reads .
 One which is dedicated to the Landlord god, Dizhu Shen (similar to Tudigong but not the same). This tablet comes in several forms: the simple form which reads , or a longer, more complex form which comprises two couplets commonly reading . 
 Two in the house, usually at least one in the living room. These tablets will usually be put in a cabinet, similar to a Japanese butsudan household shrine, and they will be usually for a family's ancestors and some other deity which may or may not be represented by a spirit tablet.
In their most simple form the spirit tablets can simply be a piece of red paper with the words written vertically (in mainland China and in Hong Kong). More complex forms exist; these could be full, small shrines made of tile, wood, metal or other material; statues and attendants with text; small posters with incense places; and so on. A common form of the tablet for Tudigong (as seen in Guangdong, China), for example, consists of a baked tile which has the core text of the tablet , flanked by two additional couplets reading ) meaning something close to "May my household welcome a great deal of auspiciousness, may my doors welcome hundreds of blessings".

In Taoism, spirit tablets are often used for ancestors.  Sometimes spirit tablets are found before or below statues of deities, which represent the enclosed spirit of the deity. 

In Buddhism, spirit tablets, known as “lotus seats” for the dead and “prosperity seats” for the living, are used in the same manner for ancestors, wandering spirits, demons, hungry ghosts, and the living (for the perpetual or temporary blessing of the donor). Temporary tablets in the form of paper are common around the time of Qingming and Ullambana dharma festivals, which are incinerated en masse at the culmination of these services.  

In Japanese Buddhism, tablets are used in funeral rites and stored in the home butsudan. Tablets are also common in Japanese temples.

In Korean culture, spirit tablets are of great importance in ancestral rites called jesa, as they are the centerpieces of food offerings and represent the spiritual presence of the deceased.

In Vietnam, spirit tablets have declined in usage due to the adoption of the Latin alphabet, and have been largely replaced on ancestral or Buddhist altars by photographs of the deceased.

Gallery

See also

 Ancestor veneration in China
 Ancestor worship
 Ancestral shrine
 Butsudan
 Chinese lineage associations and Kongsi
 Zhizha and Religious goods store
 Zhong Yuan Festival
 Ullambana
 Zupu and Chinese kin
 Chinese kinship

References

Practices in Chinese folk religion
Filial piety
Ancestral shrines
Religion in Japan
Religion in Korea
Religious Confucianism
Traditional rituals of East Asia